Thomas Swinburne may refer to:

 Thomas Robert Swinburne (1794–1864), British military administrator
 Thomas Thackeray Swinburne (1865–1926), American poet